Srbica may refer to:

Srbica
Srbica, Kičevo

See also
Srbice (disambiguation)